The 2003 1. deild was contested by 10 teams, and Havnar Bóltfelag won the championship.

League standings

Results
The schedule consisted of a total of 18 games. Each team played two games against every opponent in no particular order. One of the games was at home and one was away.

Top goalscorers
Source: faroesoccer.com

13 goals
 Hjalgrím Elttør (KÍ)

10 goals
 Andrew av Fløtum (HB)

9 goals
 Heðin á Lakjuni (B36)
 John Petersen (B36)
 Sorin Anghel (EB/Streymur)

7 goals
 Birgir Jørgensen (VB Vágur/VB)
 Clayton Nascimento (FS Vágar)
 Helgi L. Petersen (NSÍ)
 Jákup á Borg (B36)
 Rógvi Jacobsen (HB)
 Tór-Ingar Akselsen (HB)

1. deild seasons
Faroe
Faroe
1